Adam Burke is an ocean rower from Skerries, County Dublin, Ireland. He currently holds two Guinness World Records; firstly as a crew member on the Sara G, the fastest pure class ocean rowing boat to have crossed the Atlantic Ocean east to west, and secondly, as a member of the same crew that rowed the most consecutive days, achieving a distance of over 100 miles per day.  The record now stands at 12 days.

References

1980s births
Living people
Irish male rowers
Sportspeople from County Dublin
Alumni of Dundalk Institute of Technology